William B. Sampson IV (born January 1989) is an American Democratic Party politician who represents the 31st Legislative District in the New Jersey General Assembly since taking office on January 11, 2022.

Born and raised in Bayonne, New Jersey, Sampson graduated from Bayonne High School and then attended Clark Atlanta University, before heading back home and transferring to New Jersey City University. He won the support of Mayor of Bayonne James Davis for the Assembly seat that had been held by Nicholas Chiaravalloti and won the June 2021 Democratic primary. He was elected in the 2021 general election together with running mate Angela V. McKnight and became the first African American state legislator from the city when he took office.

District 31
Each of the 40 districts in the New Jersey Legislature has one representative in the New Jersey Senate and two members in the New Jersey General Assembly. The representatives from the 31st District for the 2022—23 Legislative Session are:
Senator Sandra Bolden Cunningham
Assemblywoman Angela V. McKnight
Assemblyman William Sampson

References

Living people
Year of birth unknown
Bayonne High School alumni
Clark Atlanta University alumni
Democratic Party members of the New Jersey General Assembly
New Jersey City University alumni
Politicians from Bayonne, New Jersey
1989 births